Edward Meyrick Goulburn (11 February 18182 or 3 May 1897) was an English churchman.

Son of Mr Serjeant Edward Goulburn, M.P., recorder of Leicester, and nephew of the Right Hon. Henry Goulburn, chancellor of the exchequer in the ministries of Sir Robert Peel and the Duke of Wellington, he was born in London, and was educated at Eton and at Balliol College, Oxford. In 1839 he became fellow and tutor of Merton, and was ordained in 1842. For some years he held the living of Holywell, Oxford, and was chaplain to Samuel Wilberforce, bishop of the diocese. In 1850 he delivered the Bampton Lectures at Oxford on The Resurrection of the Body. In 1849 he had succeeded Tait as headmaster of Rugby, but in 1857 he resigned, and accepted the charge of Quebec Chapel, Marylebone.

In 1858 he became a prebendary of St Paul's, and in 1859 vicar of St John's, Paddington. In 1866 he was made Dean of Norwich, and in that office exercised a long and marked influence on church life. A strong Conservative and a churchman of traditional orthodoxy, he was a keen antagonist of higher criticism and of all forms of rationalism.

His Thoughts on Personal Religion (1862) and The Pursuit of Holiness were well received; and he wrote John William Burgon, Late Dean of Chichester: A Biography, With Extracts from His Letters and Early Journals (two volumes; 1892) about his friend Dean Burgon, with whose doctrinal views he was substantially in agreement. He resigned the deanery in 1889, and died at Tunbridge Wells on 3 May 1897. There is a memorial to him at Aynho.

References

External links

Bibliographic directory from Project Canterbury

1818 births
1897 deaths
Clergy from London
Deans of Norwich
People educated at Eton College
Alumni of Balliol College, Oxford
Head Masters of Rugby School